was a private university in Chiyoda, Tokyo, Japan, established in 2006.

Access
The reception area is located on the 9th floor of the Z-kai Ochanomizu Building (Z会御茶ノ水ビル). It is a quick 1-minute walk from Exit A2 of Awajichō Station on the Tokyo Metro Marunouchi Line and Ogawamachi Station on the Toei Shinjuku Line. It is about 2 minutes by foot from Exit A4 of Shin-Ochanomizu Station on the Tokyo Metro Chiyoda Line. It takes about 7 minutes to walk from JR Kanda Station on the Yamanote Line..

External links
 Official website 

Educational institutions established in 2006
Universities and colleges in Tokyo
Teachers colleges in Japan
2006 establishments in Japan
Defunct private universities and colleges in Japan